Tervaskanto is the fourth studio album by Finnish folk metal band Korpiklaani. It was released on 26 June 2007 through Napalm Records.

Track listing

Personnel
 Jonne Järvelä - vocals, guitars, mandolin
 Cane - guitars, backing vocals
 Jarkko Aaltonen - bass
 Matti Johansson - drums, backing vocals
 Juho Kauppinen - accordion, guitars, backing vocals
 Hittavainen - violin, jouhikko, tin whistle, recorder, torupill

Guest musicians
 Nakki - additional vocals
 Pete Ilvespakka - additional vocals
 Yudai Fujita - additional vocals
 Samuel Dan - additional vocals
 Paukku - additional vocals

Production
 Harri Hinkka - photography
 Jan "Örkki" Yrlund - artwork, photography
 Mika Jussila - mastering
 Jonne Järvelä - producer
 Samu Oittinen - producer, engineering, mixing

References

2007 albums
Korpiklaani albums
Napalm Records albums